Ordeal is the fifth album by Finnish funeral doom band Skepticism.

History
The album was released through Svart Records in May 2015. It was recorded live in front of an actual audience on January 24, 2015 in Turku, Finland. The band performed six new songs and two older ones ("Pouring" and "The March and the Stream").

Track listing
 "You" – 9:21
 "Momentary" – 7:42 
 "The Departure" – 9:53
 "March Incomplete" – 12:00
 "The Road" – 6:58
 "Closing Music" – 10:20
 "Pouring" – 9:03
 "The March and the Stream" – 12:27

Personnel
Second guitarist was introduced in the concert. It was the first change in the band's Personnel since 1995.

Matti Tilaeus – vocals
Jani Kekarainen – guitars
Timo Sitomaniemi – guitars
Eero Pöyry – keyboards
Lasse Pelkonen – drums

References

2015 live albums
Skepticism (band) albums